Charles Alfred Purdue (10 June 1874 – 10 October 1941) was a New Zealand rugby union player. A loose forward, Purdue represented Southland at a provincial level. He was a member of the New Zealand national side in 1901 and 1905, appearing in three matches including an international against the touring Australian team at Dunedin in 1905. Also playing in that match was his brother Pat Purdue, the pair becoming the first brothers to play in the same test for New Zealand.

Purdue died in Invercargill on 10 October 1941, and was buried at the city's Eastern Cemetery.

References

1874 births
1941 deaths
People from Mataura
New Zealand rugby union players
New Zealand international rugby union players
Southland rugby union players
Rugby union flankers
Burials at Eastern Cemetery, Invercargill
Rugby union players from Southland, New Zealand